The Chinati Mountains of Texas are a small range in the high desert of far West Texas near the city of Presidio.  There is a pass through the mountains on Ranch to Market Road 2810, also known as Pinto Canyon Road, which connects to Farm to Market Road 170 at Ruidosa, Texas. Some believe the range derives its name from the Apache word ch'íná'itíh, which means gate or mountain pass.

The mountains are primarily composed of igneous and metamorphic rocks, and are believed to be the remains of a number of explosive volcanic caldera-building events in the remote past. The mountains are generally not forested, but rather vegetated with grasses, cactus, and brush typical of the Chihuahuan Desert. The Chinatis were extensively mined for silver from the 1860s through the 1910s.

Chinati Peak is also the highest point in Presidio County. It serves as a major landmark for the surrounding area, and its dome-shaped hump can be seen rising prominently in the distance to the southwest from US 90 between Van Horn and Marfa. Chinati Peak is encircled by jagged desert peaks and rugged canyons. The summit of Chinati Peak is broad and relatively flat, but it is surrounded by cliffs and brush-filled drainages on all sides.

The Texas Parks and Wildlife Department received a donation from the Richard King Mellon Foundation of 39,000 acres in the Chinati Mountains in the late 1990s. Texas Parks and Wildlife is in the process of conducting multi-year surveys and development of the Chinati Mountains State Natural Area. As of 2022, access to the land is limited.

See also
Chinati Mountain Caldera Complex
Infernito Caldera

References

External links
 
 
USGS Summary:  Chinati Mountains caldera volcanic rocks, including Chinati Mountains Group, Mitchell Mesa Ignimbrite, and type area of Petan Basalt
AGE AND CHARACTERIZATION OF THE RED HILLS PORPHYRY COPPER-MOLYBDENUM DEPOSIT AND ITS RELATIONSHIP TO THE CHINATI MOUNTAINS CALDERA, PRESIDIO COUNTY, TEXAS

Mountain ranges of Texas
Landforms of Presidio County, Texas